The Sixth Form College, Colchester is a sixth form college in Colchester, England. Established in 1987, it provides further education in the north Essex area.

History
The college is located on the former site of the Gilberd School. Recently constructed parts of the building were designed by local architects Martin Wilesmith and Bob Ward of the Roff Marsh Partnership.

In 1994 Blur played a show at the college – three out of four members of Blur have links with Colchester, with drummer Dave Rowntree having attended the Gilberd School.

In 2013, the college served as the backdrop for a submission in the official Brian May and Kerry Ellis crowdsourced music video for "The Kissing Me Song". A portion of the submission can be seen in the subsequent concert release "The Candlelight Concerts: Live in Montreux 2013".

Courses
The college offers courses and qualifications to more than 3100 students – including a large range of AS-Levels and A-Levels; GCSEs; and since 2003, the International Baccalaureate. It is mandatory for students studying AS/A-levels to take at least 3 academic subjects; most AS-level courses cover seven periods per week, while most A-level courses cover eight periods per week.

Additional studies
An extensive Additional Studies programme is run to suit individual interests or to support a career aim. Most courses run over two terms for between one and three periods a week, and some lead to nationally recognised qualifications.

The college's music Additional Studies are notable. It has an orchestra, a band, a choir, and has many music events throughout the year. Instrumental lessons are provided at college at a subsidised cost, and students taking music A-level or IB receive half an hour's free music tuition each week. The Essex Music Foundation also pays for the college's students to take grade 5 and 8 instrumental and theory exams, using the exam board ABRSM.

Departments 

 Art and Design
 Art
 Photography
 History of Art
 Sculpture
 Biology
 Biology
 Applied Science	
 Business Studies and Economics
 Accounting	
 Business Studies
 Applied Business	
 Economics
 Chemistry
 Chemistry 
 Science in Society	
 Computing
 Computer Science
 ICT
 Critical Thinking	
 English
 English Language
 English Literature
 English Language & Literature
 General Studies
 Geography
 Geography
 Geology
 Environmental Science
 World Development
 History
 Archaeology
 Classical Civilisation
 History – Modern
 History – Tudors
 History – Medieval
 Politics
 Ancient History
 Law
 Law
 Citizenship
 Mathematics
 Mathematics
 Further Mathematics
 Use of Mathematics
 Statistics
 Media and Film Studies
 Media
 Film
 Communication & Culture
 Modern Languages
 French
 German
 Italian
 Spanish
 Performing Arts
 Dance
 Drama
 Music
 Music Technology
 Performance Studies
 Philosophy and Religious Studies
 Philosophy
 Religious Studies
 Physical Education
 Physics
 Physics
 Electronics
 Psychology
 Sociology
 Sociology
 Anthropology
 Technology
 Graphics
 Technology (Product Design)
 Food Technology
 Textiles

Student initiatives

Committees and representation
The Sixth Form College, Colchester has a College Council which is made up of tutor group representatives, generally one per tutor group. It is designed to help students raise issues and concerns about life around College and seeks to resolve these issues or concerns. Within the College Council, there is also The College Council Executive, which is made up of elected, executive positions of Chair (leading representative of students, chairs all Council and Executive meetings and maintains links with the community), Vice-Chair (deputises for the Chair when necessary and works with the sub-committees when required), Treasurer (responsible for the College Council Budget and Expenditure) and Secretary (prepares agenda for and minutes of all meetings and deals with correspondence). The Executive is designed to spearhead changes and student-led activities around College and drive positive change. The Executive also has sub-committees for Arts, Charities, Culture, Environmental and Social, which elect a chair to sit on the Executive.

The Chair and the Vice-Chair sit on the College Governing Body

Coffee bar – Russ Shop and Ethical Café
A student volunteer-run facility that serves hot and cold drinks, and snacks. It is a Fairtrade, not-for-profit organisation supporting the Russ Foundation in India. It is open from September to May each year.

College magazine
The college produces a magazine. All the articles are written by students. In the academic year 2009/2010 the magazine was named "Insider", following this in the academic year 2010/2011 the magazine was called 'Banter', 2012/2013 was named 'Vision', and in the academic year 2013/2014 the magazine was called 'Perspective'. It was called 'Pulse' during the 2016/2017 academic year when it was, yet again, renamed—this time to "Insider", again.

Student radio
The college has run its own radio station (Storm Radio) since 1995. The shows are presented by students from both years and make use of mixed genres of music, while the station itself functions and is treated by the music industry as any other commercial radio station. The station can be received on 999AM/999MW in the college area and across the IT network in most classroom locations.  It can also be picked up in certain areas around Colchester Town Centre.  It usually broadcasts for 2 and a half hours a day, although for a one-off special in 2002 it broadcast for 24 consecutive hours.

Ofsted 
The college was assessed as 'Outstanding' by OFSTED in 2007/08, including 'outstanding' assessments in all 11 inspection categories. It was rated 'Good' in its most recent inspection in December 2017.

Academic results

A-Levels 
In 2017, the average A-Level grade was C−, and the progress score was −0.12, which is below the average progress score for schools and colleges in England.

International Baccalaureate 
The average International Baccalaureate score for students at the college was 33 points in 2015 and 2016, and 32 points in 2017, 2018 and 2019 This is slightly above the international average of 29 points.

Due to the coronavirus pandemic, average IB points are not available for the years 2020 & 2021

Notable alumni

Coffin Joe – founding member of punk rock band The Horrors
Jamie Lidell – Electronic musician
Dermot O'Leary – television and radio presenter
Luke Wright – Poet
Charlie Dobson - Athlete

References

External links

Education in Colchester
Learning and Skills Beacons
Educational institutions established in 1987
International Baccalaureate schools in England
Sixth form colleges in Essex
1987 establishments in England